Communauté d'agglomération Pays Foix-Varilhes is the communauté d'agglomération, an intercommunal structure, centred on the town of Foix. It is located in the Ariège department, in the Occitania region, southern France. Created in 2017, its seat is in Foix. Its area is 443.8 km2. Its population was 31,947 in 2019, of which 9,493 in Foix proper.

Composition
The communauté d'agglomération consists of the following 42 communes:

Arabaux
Artix
Baulou
Bénac
Le Bosc
Brassac
Burret
Calzan
Cazaux
Celles
Cos
Coussa
Crampagna
Dalou
Ferrières-sur-Ariège
Foix
Ganac
Gudas
L'Herm
Loubens
Loubières
Malléon
Montégut-Plantaurel
Montgailhard
Montoulieu
Pradières
Prayols
Rieux-de-Pelleport
Saint-Bauzeil
Saint-Félix-de-Rieutord
Saint-Jean-de-Verges
Saint-Martin-de-Caralp
Saint-Paul-de-Jarrat
Saint-Pierre-de-Rivière
Ségura
Serres-sur-Arget
Soula
Varilhes
Ventenac
Vernajoul
Verniolle
Vira

References

Foix-Varilhes
Foix-Varilhes